Peter Feldstein may refer to:
 Peter Feldstein (photographer)
 Peter Feldstein (translator)